Raja Zulqarnain (born 16 November 1954) is a Pakistani lawyer and politician. As of 2010, he was General Secretary of the Supreme Court Bar Association of Pakistan.
He is married and has four sons and a daughter.

See also
 Pakistan Bar Council (PBC)

References

External links
 Abbas, Mazhar. "DoTok with Mazhar Abbas", 30 January 2010.

Punjab Bar Council
Politicians from Punjab, Pakistan
Pakistani democracy activists
Pakistani human rights activists
1954 births
Living people